The Music Bank Chart is a record chart established in 1998 on the South Korean KBS television music program Music Bank. Every week during its live broadcast, the show gives an award for the best-performing single on the South Korean chart. The chart includes digital performance on domestic online music services (65%), album sales (5%), number of times the single was broadcast on KBS TV (20%), and viewers' choice (10%) in its ranking methodology. The score for domestic online music services is calculated using data from Melon, Bugs, Genie Music, and Soribada. Actor Park Seo-joon and Sistar member Yoon Bo-ra had hosted the show since October 2013 and continued to do so until April 24, 2015. Starting May 1, actor and singer Park Bo-gum and Red Velvet member Irene became the hosts of the show. BTS member V and B.A.P member Kim Him-chan appeared as special hosts along with Park Bo-gum on the December 4 broadcast in lieu of Irene.

In 2015, 35 singles reached number one on the chart, and 27 acts were awarded first-place trophies. Of all releases for the year, Exo's "Call Me Baby" acquired the highest point total on the April 10 broadcast with a score of 12,681. The single, along with "Lion Heart" by Girls' Generation, ranked number one on the chart for four consecutive weeks, making both singles the most awarded songs of the year. The first winner of the year was "December, 2014 (The Winter's Tale)" by Exo which debuted at number one on the January 2 broadcast. The group had four number one singles on the chart in 2015: "December, 2014 (The Winter's Tale)", "Call Me Baby", "Love Me Right" and "Sing for You", the most of any act in 2015. The four songs spent a total of nine weeks atop the chart, making Exo the act with the most wins of the year. Girl group Girls' Generation won their 100th music show win on the July 17 broadcast with their win for "Party" becoming the first artist to do so in South Korean music show history. Member Taeyeon won her first Music Bank trophy for her debut single "I" featuring singer Verbal Jint. The single spent three weeks at number one on the chart, the most of any solo artist in 2015.

Super Junior's sub-unit Super Junior-D&E consisting of members Donghae and Eunhyuk won their first ever music show trophy on Music Bank with their single "Growing Pains". Girl group Red Velvet achieved their first music show win on Music Bank with "Ice Cream Cake" from their debut extended play of the same name. Boy group BTS won their first Music Bank trophy three years after their debut with "I Need U" on the May 8 broadcast. EXID won their first Music Bank award for "Up & Down" over four months after its release after a fan-recorded video of member Hani performing the song went viral on South Korean social networking websites. CNBLUE's Jung Yong-hwa and Teen Top's Niel received their first ever solo music show trophies on Music Bank with "One Fine Day" and "Bad Girl" respectively.

Chart history

Notes

References 

2015 in South Korean music
2015 record charts
Lists of number-one songs in South Korea